Patiya is an upazila of Chattogram District in Chattogram Division, Bangladesh.

History
During the British rule, a police station(thana) was established in Patiya in 1845. It was upgraded to an upazila in 1984. The region saw revolutionary activities in the 1930s, when revolutionaries from Jugantar and the fugitives of the Chittagong armoury raid fought with British police. During the Bangladesh Liberation War, the area sustained heavy bombings from Pakistan Air Force. The Pakistani occupation army massacred more than 300 Hindus in Muzaffarabad village on 3 May 1971 in collaboration with the Razakars.

Geography

"Budbudir Chora" is one of them having enormous green forest and wild life. Every year local tourists go there for its green forest, small canals and animals like deer, birds and butterflies.

Demographics
According to the 1991 Bangladesh census, Patiya had a population of 398,836. Males constituted 52.1% of the population, and females 47.9%. The population aged 18 or over was 197,399. Patiya had an average literacy rate of 44.3% (7+ years), against the national average of 32.4%.

Administration
Patiya Upazila is divided into Patiya Municipality and 22 union parishads: Asia, Bara Uthan, Baralia, Bhatikhain, Chanhara, Char Lakshya, Char Patharghata, Dakshin Bhurshi, Dhalghat, Habilasdwip, Haidgaon, Janglukhain, Jiri, Juldha, Kachuai, Kasiais, Kelishahar, Kharana, Kolagaon, Kusumpura, Sikalbaha, and Sobhandandi. The union parishads are subdivided into 113 mauzas and 208 villages.

Patiya Municipality is subdivided into 9 wards and 13 mahallas.

Chairman:MOTAHERUL ISLAM CHY,

Vice Chairman: Syed yar Mohammad Peyaru,

Woman Vice Chairman:Afroza Begum from BNP

'''Upazila Nirbahi Officer (UNO): Abdullah Al Mamun
"Patiya Municipal Mayor": Professor Md.Harunur Rashid "

Education

According to Banglapedia, Abdur Rahman Government Girls' High School, founded in 1957, Abdus Sobhan Rahat Ali High School (1914), Chakrashala Krishi High School (1857), Muzaffarabad N. J. High School (1929), S A Noor High School (1966), Union Krishi High School (1978) and Patiya Model High School (1845) are notable secondary schools.

The madrasa education system includes a notable kamil madrasa, Shahchand Auliya Kamil Madrasa, founded in 1928.

Notable residents
 Purnendu Dastidar, revolutionary politician and writer, was born in Dhalghat village in 1909.
 Maniruzzaman Islamabadi, Islamic philosopher and journalist, was from Barama village.
 Pritilata Waddedar, revolutionary nationalist, was born at Dhalghat village in 1911.
Ayub Bachchu, a Bangladeshi musician.

See also
Upazilas of Bangladesh
Districts of Bangladesh
Divisions of Bangladesh

References

Upazilas of Chittagong District